Sir Leonard Erskine Hill FRS (2 June 1866, in Bruce Castle, Tottenham – 30 March 1952, in Corton, Suffolk) was a British physiologist. He was elected a Fellow of the Royal Society in 1900 and was knighted in 1930.  One of his sons was the epidemiologist and statistician Austin Bradford Hill. His father was George Birkbeck Hill, the famous scholar and commentator on the works of Samuel Johnson, who at the time of his birth was headmaster of Bruce Castle School.

Education 
Sir Leonard Erskine Hill attended Haileybury College. He later received his MB from University College, London in 1890. In 1931, he received an honorary LLD from the University of Aberdeen.

Medicine 
Hill's work on blood pressure led him to believe "the arterial pressure can be taken in man as rapidly, simply, and accurately as the temperature can be taken with the clinical thermometer". This work developed into the Hill's sign. Hill was the second recipient of the T. K. Sidey Medal, set up by the Royal Society of New Zealand as an award for outstanding scientific research.

Hill was an advocate of light therapy and in 1924 authored Sunshine and Open Air: Their Influence on Health.

Diving medicine 
Hill performed research into decompression sickness, oxygen toxicity, and effects of carbon dioxide in diving.

Hill advocated linear or uniform decompression profiles. This type of decompression is used today by saturation divers. His work was financed by Augustus Siebe and the Siebe Gorman Company.

Other interests 
Hill was a distinguished watercolourist and also wrote children's stories. He was fond of the outdoor life, and went every day to bathe in a pond in Epping Forest at Loughton where he lived. He later moved to Hampstead.

Selected publications

A Textbook of Physiology (with Martin William Flack, 1919)
The Science of Ventilation and Open Air Treatment (1919)
Sunshine and Open Air: Their Influence on Health (1924)
Health and Environment (with Argyll Campbell, 1925)
Philosophy of a Biologist (1930)
Manual of Human Physiology (1935)

See also

References

External links

 Chris Pond, The Buildings of Loughton and Notable people of the town [rev ed.2010]
Royal Society election certificate

1858 births
1952 deaths
Decompression researchers
English medical writers
English physiologists
Fellows of the Royal Society
Light therapy advocates